The PEN/Robert W. Bingham Prize for Debut Short Story Collection is awarded by the PEN America (formerly PEN American Center) "to exceptionally talented fiction writers whose debut work — a first novel or collection of short stories ... represent distinguished literary achievement and suggests great promise." The winner is selected by a panel of PEN Members made up of three writers or editors. The PEN/Robert W. Bingham Prize was originally named the PEN/Robert Bingham Fellowship for Writers. The prize awards the debut writer a cash award of US$25,000.

The PEN/Robert W. Bingham Prize was established in memory of Robert W. Bingham, who died in 1999 at the age of 33, to commemorate his support of young writers, his love of literature, and his contribution to literary fiction.

The award is one of many PEN awards sponsored by International PEN affiliates in over 145 PEN centres around the world. The PEN American Center awards have been characterized as being among the "major" American literary prizes.

Award winners

References

External links
PEN/Robert W. Bingham Prize for Debut Short Story Collection

PEN America awards
Awards established in 2002
2002 establishments in the United States
First book awards
American fiction awards
Short story awards